A wagon or waggon is a heavy four-wheeled vehicle pulled by draught animals or on occasion by humans, used for transporting goods, commodities, agricultural materials, supplies and sometimes people.

Wagons are immediately distinguished from carts (which have two wheels) and from lighter four-wheeled vehicles primarily for carrying people, such as carriages. Animals such as horses, mules, or oxen usually pull wagons. One animal or several, often in pairs or teams may pull wagons. However, there are examples of human-propelled wagons, such as mining corfs.

A wagon was formerly called a wain and one who builds or repairs wagons is a wainwright. More specifically, a wain is a type of horse- or oxen-drawn, load-carrying vehicle, used for agricultural purposes rather than transporting people. A wagon or cart, usually four-wheeled; for example, a haywain, normally has four wheels, but the term has now acquired slightly poetical connotations, so is not always used with technical correctness. However, a two-wheeled "haywain" would be a hay cart, as opposed to a carriage. Wain is also an archaic term for a chariot. Wain can also be a verb, to carry or deliver, and has other meanings.

Contemporary or modern animal-drawn wagons may be of metal instead of wood and have regular wheels with rubber tires instead of traditional wagon wheels.

A person who drives wagons is called a "wagoner", a "teamster", a "bullocky" (Australia), a "muleteer", or simply a "driver".

Terminology and design
The exact name and terminology used are often dependent on the design or shape of the wagon. If low and sideless it may be called a dray, trolley or float. When traveling over long distances and periods, wagons may be covered with cloth to protect their contents from the elements; these are "covered wagons". If it has a permanent top enclosing it, it may be called a "van".

Front axle assembly 

A front axle assembly, in its simplest form, is an assembly of a short beam with a pivot plate, two wagon wheels and spindles as well as a drawbar attached to this. A pin attaches the device to a chariot, a wagon or a coach, making the turning radius smaller.

Types of wagons
Wagons have served numerous purposes, with numerous corresponding designs. As with motorized vehicles, some are designed to serve as many functions as possible, while others are highly specialized. This section will discuss a broad overview of the general classes of wagons; for details on specific types of wagons, see the individual links.

Beach wagon
Beach wagons are collapsible folding wagons for general multi-purpose usage on outdoor sand beaches.

Farm wagon
Farm wagons are built for general multi-purpose usage in an agricultural or rural setting. These include gathering hay, crops and wood, and delivering them to the farmstead or market. Wagons can also be pulled with tractors for easy transportation of those materials.

A common type of farm wagon particular to North America is the buckboard.

Freight wagon
Freight wagons are wagons used for the overland hauling of freight and bulk commodities.

Freight wagons were designed for hauling loads, not people, and were not built for comfort.  A driver did not have a seat in front of the wagon like the image most people have of wagons.  A driver walked along side the wagon or rode on top of one of the horses.  There was no place in front for a person to sit.  Many freight wagons, however, had a unique feature called a "lazyboard."  This was a plank that could be pulled out and sat on, and then pushed back in if not needed.  It was located on the left side of the wagon between the wheels and close to the brake.  If a driver was too tired to walk, he could pull out the lazyboard, and take a rest.  That is why it was called a "lazyboard."  (Some sources spell "lazyboard" as two words.  There is no standard spelling.)  In America, lazyboards were located on the left side because carts were steered from the left side.  The cart itself was on the right side of the road.  Unless a driver wanted to walk in the ditch, he had to steer from the left side.  In Europe, carts were steered from the right side.  The cart itself was driven on the left side of the road, as vehicles are driven there today.  A European freight wagon had its lazyboard on the right side. In both places the driver would walk in the center of the road. More than a hundred years ago, almost everyone knew what a "lazyboard" was.  Today, almost nobody would know.

In the United States and Canada, the Conestoga wagon was a predominant form of wagon used for hauling freight in the late 18th and 19th centuries, often used for hauling goods on the Great Wagon Road in the Appalachian Valley and across the Appalachian Mountains.

Even larger freight wagons existed.

Delivery wagon 
A delivery wagon is a wagon used to deliver merchandise such as milk, bread, or produce to houses or markets, as well as to commercial customers, often in urban settings. The concept of express wagons and of paneled delivery vans developed in the 19th century. By the end of the 19th century, delivery wagons were often finely painted, lettered and varnished, so as to serve as advertisement for the particular business through the quality of the wagon. Special forms of delivery wagon include an ice wagon and a milk wagon.

Nomadic wagons
Some wagons are intended to serve as mobile homes or mobile workshops. These include the Vardo, a traditional wagon of the 19th-century British Romani people.

Living van

Steam wagon

The steam wagon, a self-powered development of the horse-drawn wagon, was a surprisingly late innovation, entering service only in the late nineteenth century.

Irrigation tank wagon 
In the city center of Schwäbisch Gmünd, Germany, since 1992 the city's plants are irrigated using a horse-drawn wagon with a water tank.

Horse drawn wooden tank wagon 

A horse-drawn wooden tank wagon is a wooden cylinder on four wagon wheels. It can carry water, liquid manure or other liquids, but not in turn in the same wagon.

War wagon

Gravity wagon

Chuckwagon

Ox wagon

Pageant wagon

Gallery

Wagon train

In migration and military settings, wagons were often found in large groups called wagon trains.

In warfare, large groups of supply wagons were used to support traveling armies with food and munitions, forming "baggage trains". During the American Civil War, these wagon trains would often be accompanied by the wagons of private merchants, known as sutlers, who sold goods to soldiers, as well as the wagons of photographers and news reporters. Special purpose-built support wagons existed for blacksmithing, telegraphy and even observation ballooning.

In migration settings, such as the emigrant trails of the American West and the Great Trek of South Africa, wagons would travel together for support, navigation and protection. A group of wagons may be used to create an improvised fort called a laager, made by circling them to form an enclosure. In these settings, a chuckwagon is a small wagon used for providing food and cooking, essentially a portable kitchen.

Wagons in art 

As a common, important element in history and life, wagons have been the subjects of artwork. Some examples are the paintings The Hay Wain and The Haywain Triptych, and on the Oregon Trail Memorial half dollar.

Motorized wagons

During a transition to mechanized vehicles from animal-powered, the term wagon was sometimes used such as with the Duryea Motor Wagon. In modern times the term station wagon survives as a type of automobile. It describes a car with a passenger compartment that extends to the back of the vehicle, that has no trunk, that has one or more rear seats that can be folded making space for carrying cargo, as well as featuring an opening tailgate or liftgate.

See also

Ackermann steering geometry
Animal powered vehicles
Araba (carriage)
Bronocice pot
Cart
Carriage
Cart wheel
Chariot
Chuckwagon
Chuckwagon racing
Circle the wagons
Coach (carriage)
Horsebus
Horse-drawn vehicle
Horse harness
Lorry (horse-drawn)
Millwright, an industrial mechanic
Omnibus
Pageant wagon
Scenery wagon
Stage wagon
Telega
Toy wagon
Trolley
Types of carriages
Vardo (Romani wagon)
Wagon brake
Wagonette
Wagon wheel
Wagon-wheel effect

References

External links